Richard Hull (died 21 June 1759) was an Anglo-Irish politician.

Hull was a Member of Parliament for Carysfort in the Irish House of Commons between 1728 and his death in 1759.

References

Year of birth unknown
1759 deaths
17th-century Anglo-Irish people
Irish MPs 1727–1760
Members of the Parliament of Ireland (pre-1801) for County Wicklow constituencies